Jake David Shapiro (born March 18, 1969) is an American filmmaker and stand-up comedian. Shapiro is best known as the original screenwriter of the film Robin Hood: Men in Tights and for writing the screenplay adaptation of L. Ron Hubbard's novel Battlefield Earth. 

Battlefield won more Golden Raspberry Awards than any other film up to that point, and Shapiro accepted the dubious award in person. Shapiro was fired from the film due to creative disagreements during pre-production and wanted to be credited with a pseudonym, and also said little or nothing of his script remained in the final film after extensive re-writes. Shapiro later apologized for involvement in the widely panned film.

Filmography

Awards and nominations

See also
List of people who accepted Golden Raspberry Awards

References

External links

1969 births
American male screenwriters
Living people